George W. Parsons (21 April 1926 – 24 November 2009) was a Welsh dual-code international rugby union, and professional rugby league footballer who played in the 1940s and 1950s. He coached Salford from 1960 to 1963.

Playing career

International honours
George Parsons represented Wales XV (RU) while at Abertillery RFC in the 'Victory International' non-Test match(es) between December 1945 and April 1946, won a cap for Wales (RU) while at Newport RFC in 1947 against England, won caps for Wales (RL) while at St. Helens, and Salford.

Parsons also represented Great Britain (RL) while at St. Helens in 1951 against Australasia at Headingley in a Festival of Britain match, and in 1953 against France (1 non-Test match) in Lyons.

Along with William "Billy" Banks, Edward "Ted" Cahill, Gordon Haynes, Keith Holliday, William "Billy" Ivison, Robert "Bob" Kelly, John McKeown and Edward "Ted" Slevin, Parsons' only Great Britain appearance came against France prior to 1957, these matches were not considered as Test matches by the Rugby Football League, and consequently caps were not awarded.

Challenge Cup Final appearances
George Parsons played left-, i.e. number 11, in St. Helens' 10–15 defeat by Huddersfield in the 1953 Challenge Cup Final during the 1952–53 season at Wembley Stadium, London on Saturday 25 April 1953. and played left- in the 13-2 victory over Halifax in the 1956 Challenge Cup Final during the 1955–56 season at Wembley Stadium, London on Saturday 28 April 1956, in front of a crowd of 79,341.

County Cup Final appearances
George Parsons played left-, i.e. number 11, in St. Helens' 5–22 defeat by Leigh in the 1952 Lancashire County Cup Final during the 1952–53 season at Station Road, Swinton on Saturday 29 November 1952, played left- in the 16–8 victory over Wigan in the 1953 Lancashire County Cup Final during the 1953–54 season at Station Road, Swinton on Saturday 24 October 1953, played left- in the 3–10 defeat by Oldham in the 1956 Lancashire County Cup Final during the 1956–57 season at Central Park, Wigan on Saturday 20 October 1956.

Honoured at St Helens R.F.C.
George Parsons is a St Helens R.F.C. Hall of Fame inductee.

Outside of rugby
Parsons was a senior manager at the Pilkington glass factory in St. Helens, he was also a magistrate, and a Liberal Party councillor.

References

External links
!Great Britain Statistics at englandrl.co.uk (statistics currently missing due to not having appeared for both Great Britain, and England)
Profile at saints.org.uk
(archived by web.archive.org) Abertillery RFC History
(archived by web.archive.org) Programme for France v Wales 1947
Last farewell to true rugby great
 Welsh stars still had a rugby ball in wartime
Profile at blackandambers.co.uk

1926 births
2009 deaths
Abertillery RFC players
Cardiff RFC players
Dual-code rugby internationals
Great Britain national rugby league team players
Liberal Party (UK) councillors
Liberal Party (UK) politicians
English justices of the peace
Newbridge RFC players
Newport RFC players
Rochdale Hornets players
Rugby league players from Caerphilly County Borough
Rugby league second-rows
Rugby union locks
Rugby union players from Newbridge, Caerphilly
Salford Red Devils coaches
Salford Red Devils players
St Helens R.F.C. players
Wales international rugby union players
Wales national rugby league team players
Welsh rugby league players
Welsh rugby union players